Julien Guadet (1834–1908) was a French architect, theoretician and professor at the École des Beaux-Arts, Paris.

References

1834 births
1908 deaths
Architectural theoreticians
19th-century French architects
Officiers of the Légion d'honneur
Architects from Paris
Prix de Rome for architecture